The Indonesian football champions are the winners of the highest league of Indonesian men's football, which since 2017 is the Liga 1.

Perserikatan, an amateur inter-cities competition, was first established under auspices of the Football Association of Indonesia (PSSI) in 1930. From Indonesia's independence in August 1945 until the establishment of the semi-professional Galatama, Perserikatan was the premier club football competition in the country. Perserikatan and Galatama ran in parallel until 1994, when it was merged to form Liga Indonesia, the first professional football league in Indonesia. The structure remained until 2008, when the Indonesia Super League was established.

A PSSI internal dispute led into the creation of Indonesian Premier League in 2011, and it ran in parallel with the Super League for two seasons. The Super League became the top-flight league once again in 2013, but was prematurely ended in May 2015 following Indonesian government's ban on PSSI activities, which subsequently led to the suspension of PSSI from FIFA membership. The current top-flight league, Liga 1, was launched in 2017.

This list does not include the champion of Liga Primer Indonesia, a short-lived, not officially recognized independent football league that existed between September 2010 and April 2011, which was subsequently merged into the Premier League.

List of champions

Inlandsche Stedenwedstrĳden (1930–1943)
Source:

Perserikatan (1950–1994)
Source:

Galatama (1979–1994)

Premier Division (1994–2008)
Before 2008 the highest level of professional football competition in Indonesia was the Premier Division. It used the combination format of double round-robin first round and single eliminations second round.

Super League (2008–2015)

Premier League (2011–2013)

Liga 1 (2017–present)

Other tournaments
Several tournaments were organized in the place of a top-flight football league during Indonesia's suspension from FIFA between December 2015 and May 2016. The winners are not officially recognized as Indonesian champion.

Total titles won

See also 
List of football clubs in Indonesia by major honours won
Indonesian football league system
Liga 1

Notes

Content notes

Explanatory notes

References

External links 
Official website of Liga Indonesia
Indonesia Super League's page on FIFA.com

Indonesia
Association football in Indonesia lists
Perserikatan
Galatama
Indonesian Premier Division
Indonesia Super League